Clarence Hawkes (December 16, 1869 – January 19, 1954) was an American author and lecturer, known for his nature stories and poetry.

Biography
Born in Goshen, Massachusetts, Hawkes was physically disabled at a young age; part of one leg was amputated when he was nine, and he became blind four years later after a gun discharged in his face during a hunting accident. He was subsequently educated at the Perkins School for the Blind in Boston, where he befriended the young Helen Keller. In 1899, he married Bessie Bell, who illustrated his first book, and the couple moved to Hadley. His prolific career saw the publication of over 100 volumes on a variety of topics; upon his death, the New York Times referred to him as the "blind poet of Hadley".

In 2009, English professor James A. Freeman published the book Clarence Hawkes: America's Blind Naturalist and the World He Lived In to coincide with the 150th anniversary of Hadley's birth.

Selected list of works

Pebbles and Shells: Verses (1895)
Shaggycoat: The Biography of a Beaver (1906)
Black Bruin: The Biography of a Bear (1908)
King Of The Thundering Herd: The Biography Of An American Bison (1911) 
Piebald, King of Bronchos: The Biography of a Wild Horse (1912)
Bing: The Story of a Small Dog's Love (1920)
Dapples of the Circus: The Story of a Shetland Pony and a Boy (1923)

See also
Ernest William Hawkes, his brother and anthropologist of Alaskan and Northern Canadian Indigenous people

References
"Fiction: Jungle Joe". Time. April 19, 1926. Retrieved April 28, 2010.

External links
 
 
 
 

1869 births
1954 deaths
American male writers
American amputees
American blind people